Baumhaueria is a genus of flies in the family Tachinidae.

Species
B. goniaeformis (Meigen, 1824)
B. microps Mesnil, 1963
B. tibialis Villeneuve, 1910

References

Tachinidae genera
Exoristinae
Taxa named by Johann Wilhelm Meigen